Michelle L. Wahlgren (born December 17, 1964) is the owner and CEO of We Bring It On, Inc.  Her area of specialty is implementing change and leading transformation within the business environment.   She is a business consultant and motivational speaker.

Early life 
Wahlgren was born in Los Angeles, and adopted by Richard O. Wahlgren and Patricia A. Wahlgren (now Patricia A. Gemmell). She was raised in Pacific Palisades, California.

Career 
Prior to opening her own business consultancy firm, Wahlgren was the CIO of Anschutz Entertainment Group (AEG).  She was hired as the MIS Director for AEG in 2002 when the organization owned and operated two entertainment facilities, STAPLES Center, and the Kodak Theatre, five MLS soccer teams, including San Jose Earthquakes, Los Angeles Galaxy, New York Red Bulls formerly known as the New Jersey Metrostars, Chicago Fire, and the Colorado Rapids, and the Los Angeles Kings Hockey Team." She led the technology division of the organization through a global growth initiative that included the acquisition of existing businesses, construction of new entertainment districts and facilities, and the reorganization of business divisions. By the time she resigned from her post in 2010 to begin her consultancy, AEG was recognized as “the world's largest owner of sports teams and sports events, the owner of the world’s most profitable sports and entertainment venues, and under AEG Live the world's second largest presenter of live music and entertainment events after Live Nation”.

Previous positions held by Michelle were Information Systems Manager for the Western Region of Ticketmaster Corp, Manager of Secondary Marketing for Westcoast Savings and Loan, and Assistant Vice President, Sales and Training Manager for Security Pacific Bank.

Career accomplishments 
Over the course of her career, Wahlgren has led many organizational initiatives involving change including:

 The technology implementation required to transform London’s Millennium Dome into a world-class entertainment district known as The O2 which was awarded both Best New Concert Venue and Best International Arena of the Year by the Pollstar Concert Industry in 2007.

 The technology implementation required to transform parking lots in Los Angeles, California into a 4-million-square-foot sports, entertainment and residential district adjacent to the Los Angeles Convention Center, known as LA LIVE.

 The acquisition of 15 individual concert touring and live entertainment companies, and the new construction and renovation of 22 clubs and concert venues around the world, forming AEG LIVE, now recognized as “the world's second largest presenter of live music and entertainment events after Live Nation”.

 Relocated the MLS soccer team formerly known as the San Jose Earthquakes from San Jose to Houston, Texas, changing the name to Houston Dynamo.
The transformation of the technology support structure used by Ticketmaster Corp as it redefined its business model and merged with Citysearch Inc.
 Responsible for the secondary marketing function of Westcoast Savings and Loan in 1987 when the savings and loan industry experienced legal difficulties and many collapsed.  She organized the strategy to gradually close her division to coincide with the closing of this business during the Savings and Loan Crisis.

Lectures and interviews 

 "Tech and the Fan Experience", 2009 Cisco Podcast Series 
 "Re-engineering Life"  Technology's Role in the Environmental Revolution,2008 Cisco Symposium, Germany. 
 "Operationalizing Web 2.0", 2007 Cisco Expo, Germany.
 “Organize Your Mind for Success”, Leadership Series, 2009, Los Angeles, CA  
 “Take Charge of Your Future” Leadership Series, 2010, Los Angeles, Ca
 “Removing the Obstacles”, Leadership Series, 2011, Los Angeles, CA

References

1964 births
Living people
American motivational speakers
Women motivational speakers
Businesspeople from California